Blida is a province (wilaya) in Algeria. Its capital is Blida. The Chréa National Park is situated here.

History
The province was created from parts of Alger (department) and El Asnam department in 1974.

In 1984 Tipaza Province was carved out of its territory.

Administrative divisions
It is made up of 10 districts and 25 municipalities.

The districts are:

 Blida
 Boufarik
 Bougara
 Bouïnian
 El Affroun
 Larbaâ
 Meftah
 Mouzaïa
 Oued El Alleug
 Ouled Yaïch

The municipalities are:

 Aïn Romana
 Ben Khéllil
 Blida
 Bouarfa
 Boufarik
 Bougara
 Bouïnian
 Béni Mered
 Béni Tamou
 Chiffa
 Chréa
 Chébli
 Djebabra (Djebara)
 El Affroun
 Guerrouaou
 Hammam Melouane
 Larbaâ
 Meftah
 Mouzaïa
 Oued Djer
 Oued El Alleug
 Ouled Selama
 Ouled Yaïch
 Souhane
 Soumaâ

Villages
The villages of Blida Province are:
 Souakria

Natural features
This province has one of the few habitat areas in Algeria that supports a sub-population of the Barbary macaque, Macaca sylvanus.

Notable people

 Mhamed Yazid (1923-2003), politician
 Mahfoud Nahnah (1942-2003), leader and politician
  (1893-1976), theologian
  (1941-1993), politician and martyr
 Yahia Boushaki (Shahid) (1935-1960), leader and martyr

References

External links
 Official website

 
Provinces of Algeria
States and territories established in 1974